Wittmackia bicolor is a species of flowering plant in the family Bromeliaceae, endemic to south Brazil (the state of Santa Catarina). It was first described by Lyman Bradford Smith in 1955 as Aechmea bicolor.

References

Bromelioideae
Flora of Brazil
Plants described in 1955